North Township may refer to:

Indiana
 North Township, Lake County, Indiana
 North Township, Marshall County, Indiana

Kansas
 North Township, Labette County, Kansas, in Labette County, Kansas
 North Township, Woodson County, Kansas, in Woodson County, Kansas

Minnesota
 North Township, Minnesota

Missouri
 North Township, Dade County, Missouri

Ohio
 North Township, Harrison County, Ohio

Township name disambiguation pages